The Boston Back Bay Center was a proposed large development project proposed by Walter Gropius and The Architects Collaborative in the Boston's Back Bay in 1953.
The plan was proposed be built on the Boston and Albany Rail Yard. It was to contain four large office buildings, a shopping center, a convention hall, a hotel and a motel.
One key goal of the plan was to make the center accessible to the automobile, in order to make the site competitive with suburban shopping centers. The initial project was ultimately prevented from moving forward because the Massachusetts Supreme Judicial Court ruled that the railroad yards could not be considered "blighted" and that giving investors a tax concession for the project would have been an inappropriate use of public money for private development. Before Prudential purchased the air rights to the parcel in 1957, they consulted with the Back Bay Center designers, but decided to hire Charles Luckman to design Prudential Center instead. A tax concession was ultimately achieved through legislation in 1960 that extended the power of the Boston Redevelopment Authority (BRA) to contain the planning function. The BRA declared the rail yards, now abandoned, to be a blighted area, and Prudential was able to develop the site with a tax concession.

References

Buildings and structures in Boston
Unbuilt buildings and structures in the United States
Proposed buildings and structures in Massachusetts
Walter Gropius